Tistrup is a town in southwestern Jutland in the Varde Municipality, in Region of Southern Denmark. As of 1 January 2022, it has a population of 1,433.

Interest in archaeology in the late 19th century records excavations for buried relics near Tistrup, by Captain A. P. Madsen, of the Museum of Northern Antiquities

References

External links

Cities and towns in the Region of Southern Denmark
Varde Municipality